The Lissamphibia (from Greek λισσός (lissós, “smooth”) + ἀμφίβια (amphíbia), meaning "smooth amphibians") is a group of tetrapods that includes all modern amphibians. Lissamphibians consist of three living groups: the Salientia (frogs, toads, and their extinct relatives), the Caudata (salamanders, newts, and their extinct relatives), and the Gymnophiona (the limbless caecilians and their extinct relatives). A fourth group, the Allocaudata, was moderately successful, spanning 160 million years from the Middle Jurassic to the Early Pleistocene, but became extinct two million years ago.

For several decades, this name has been used for a group that includes all living amphibians, but excludes all the main groups of Paleozoic tetrapods, such as Temnospondyli, Lepospondyli, Embolomeri, and Seymouriamorpha. Some scientists have concluded that all of the primary groups of modern amphibians—frogs, salamanders and caecilians—are closely related.

Some writers have argued that the early Permian dissorophoid Gerobatrachus hottoni is a lissamphibian. If it is not, the earliest known lissamphibians are Triadobatrachus and Czatkobatrachus from the Early Triassic.

Characteristics

Some, if not all, lissamphibians share the following characteristics. Some of these apply to the soft body parts, hence do not appear in fossils. However, the skeletal characteristics also appear in several types of Palaeozoic amphibians:
 Double or paired occipital condyles
 Two types of skin glands (mucous and granular)
 Fat bodies associated with gonads
 Double-channeled sensory papillae in the inner ear
 Green rods (a special type of visual cell, unknown in caecilians)
 Ribs do not encircle body. Anurans do not have ribs.
 Ability to elevate the eyes (with the levator bulbi muscle)
 Forced-pump respiratory mechanism, the primitive breathing system also found in labyrinthodont amphibians
 Cylindrical centra (the main body of the vertebrae; cylindrical centra are also found in several groups of early tetrapods)
 Pedicellate teeth (the crowns of the teeth are separated from the roots by a zone of fibrous tissue; also found in some Dissorophoidea; the teeth of some fossil salamanders are not pedicellate)
 Bicuspid teeth (two cusps per tooth, also found in juvenile dissorophoids)
 Operculum (small bone in the skull, linked to shoulder girdle by the opercularis muscle; perhaps involved in hearing and balance; absent in caecilians and some salamanders, fused to the columella (ear bone) in most anurans)
 Loss of posterior skull bones (also in Microsauria and Dissorophoidea)
 Small, widely separated pterygoid bones (also found in Temnospondyli and Nectridea)
 Wide cultriform process of the parasphenoid (also found in some Microsauria (Rhynchonkos) and Lysorophia)

Relationships and definition

The features uniting the Lissamphibia were first noted by Ernst Haeckel, even though in Haeckel's work, Lissamphibia excluded the caecilians. Nevertheless, Haeckel considered the caecilians to be closely related to what he called Lissamphibia (gr. λισσός, smooth), which is now called Batrachia and includes frogs and salamanders. In the early to mid 20th century, a biphyletic origin of amphibians (and thus of tetrapods in general) was favoured. In the late 20th century, a flood of new fossil evidence mapped out in some detail the nature of the transition between the elpistostegalid fish and the early amphibians. Most herpetologists and paleontologists, therefore, no longer accept the view that amphibians have arisen twice, from two related but separate groups of fish. The question then arises whether Lissamphibia is monophyletic as well. Unfortunately, the origin and relationships of the various lissamphibian groups both with each other and among other early tetrapods remain controversial. Not all paleontologists today are convinced that Lissamphibia is indeed a natural group, as there are important characteristics shared with some non-lissamphibian Palaeozoic amphibians.

Currently, the two prevailing theories of lissamphibian origin are:
 Monophyletic within Temnospondyli
 Monophyletic within Lepospondyli

One of the hypotheses regarding their ancestors is that they evolved by paedomorphosis and miniaturization from early tetrapods.

Recent molecular studies of extant amphibians based on multiple-locus data favor one or the other of the monophyletic alternatives and indicate a Late Carboniferous date for the divergence of the lineage leading to caecilians from the one leading to frogs and salamanders, and an early Permian date for the separation of the frog and salamander groups.

References

Bibliography
 Benton, M. J. (2005), Vertebrate Palaeontology, 3rd ed. Blackwell.
 Carroll, R. L. (1988), Vertebrate Paleontology and Evolution, WH Freeman & Co.

External links
 Biology 356 - Major Features of Vertebrate Evolution by Dr. Robert Reisz, University of Toronto

Amphibians
Extant Early Triassic first appearances
Taxa named by Ernst Haeckel